KIXW (960 kHz "Talk 960") is a commercial AM radio station licensed to Apple Valley, California.  It is owned by EDB VV License LLC.  The studios and offices are on Hesperia Road in Victorville.  The transmitter is off Rincon Road in Apple Valley.

History
On June 5, 1954, the station signed on as KAVR.  The call sign stood for "Apple Valley Radio."  The station was owned by Newton T. Bass, under the corporate name Apple Valley Broadcasting.  The station was a daytimer, powered at 5,000 watts.  But to avoid interfering with other stations on AM 960, it had to sign-off at sunset.

In 1998, the station was sold to Crown Broadcasting.  At the time, it aired an oldies format.

Barb Stanton 
In the early 2000s, KIXW had a locally based talk program, "The Barb Stanton Show." The show was cancelled in mid-May 2007 after Ms. Stanton made comments on the air regarding what she perceived as the massive influx of Asian-Americans into the Victor Valley. The comments were prompted when she found out that a Victorville-based bank was about to be bought out by Pasadena-based East West Bank, owned by Dominic Ng, a third-generation Asian-American resident of Pasadena.

References

External links 
 official website

IXW-AM
Talk radio stations in the United States
Radio stations established in 2001
Victorville, California
2001 establishments in California